Somanath may refer to:

 Somnath temple, a temple in Gujarat, India
 Prabhas Patan, the town in which Somnath temple is located, also sometimes referred to as "Somnath."
 Somanath, Dahanu, a village in Maharashtra, India
 Mekapotula Somanath, Indian art director